Chotanagpur Law College (also known as C.N. Law College) is a college imparting legal education in Ranchi, Jharkhand. The College was established in the year 1954 under the tutelage of Barrister S.K. Sahay and was first affiliated to the Bihar University and thereafter to Ranchi University. This college is also approved by the Bar Council of India. The College has UGC and NAAC Accreditation.

Courses 
The college offers a five-years integrated B.A. LL.B. (Hons.) course, three-years LL.B. course and two years LL.M. (Master of Laws) course also. The college is starting a 5-year LL.B for students who have passed the Intermediate exams for academic year 2019.
The college takes admission to all these courses through an entrance Test conducted by itself and also takes in students through the LSAT Exam.

Notable alumni 
Notable alumni of the college include.
S.B. Sinha- Former Judge of the Supreme Court of India.
M. Y. Eqbal- Former Judge of the Supreme Court of India.

See also
Education in India
Ranchi University
List of law schools in India
Literacy in India
List of institutions of higher education in Jharkhand

References

External links 
 http://www.cnlawcollege.org

Law schools in Jharkhand
Colleges affiliated to Ranchi University
Universities and colleges in Ranchi
Educational institutions established in 1954
1954 establishments in Bihar
Universities and colleges in Jharkhand